Puerto Rico Highway 502 (PR-502) is a tertiary state highway in Ponce, Puerto Rico. The road runs north to south through barrio Quebrada Limón. Its southern terminus is at an intersection with PR-132. Its northern terminus is at its intersection with PR-501.

Major intersections

See also

 List of highways in Ponce, Puerto Rico
 List of highways numbered 502

References

External links
 
 Guía de Carreteras Principales, Expresos y Autopistas 

502
Roads in Ponce, Puerto Rico
Barrio Canas
Barrio Quebrada Limón
Barrio Marueño